Franz Matter (1931–1999) was a Swiss actor and film director. A noted stage actor, Matter also appeared in a number of films including the 1958 literary adaptation The Cheese Factory in the Hamlet. He also worked as an assistant director, and directed the 1961 film Rosen auf Pump.

Filmography

Actor

References

External links

Bibliography 
 Goble, Alan. The Complete Index to Literary Sources in Film. Walter de Gruyter, 1999.

1931 births
1999 deaths
Swiss male film actors
People from Seeland District
20th-century Swiss male actors